Bardian (also Romanized as Bardīān, Bardiyan, and Bordeyān; also known as Burdiun and Būrdūn) is a village in Alqchin Rural District, in the Central District of Charam County, Kohgiluyeh and Boyer-Ahmad Province, Iran. At the 2006 census, its population was 1,641, in 337 families.

References 

Populated places in Charam County